The title Duke of Ross has been created twice in the Peerage of Scotland, both times for younger sons of the King of Scotland. Named for Ross in Scotland, it was first created in 1488 for James Stewart, Earl of Ross, the second son of James III. On his early death in 1504, the title became extinct.

The title was created a second time for Alexander Stewart, the youngest son of James IV. On his death at the age of one in 1515 the title became extinct.

Dukes of Ross, first creation (1488)
Other titles: Marquess of Ormonde (1488), Earl of Ross, Earl of Ardmenach and Lord Brechin and Navar (1481)
James Stewart, Duke of Ross (1476–1504), second son of James III

Dukes of Ross, second creation (1514)
Alexander Stewart, Duke of Ross (1514–1515), posthumous fourth and youngest son of James IV

References

Extinct dukedoms in the Peerage of Scotland
1488 establishments in Scotland
1514 establishments in Scotland
Noble titles created in 1488
Noble titles created in 1514